The Yıldırım Cabinet was the 65th government of the Republic of Turkey, which was declared on 24 May 2016. The cabinet was inaugurated on 29 May 2016, by the approval of the Grand National Assembly. It is composed of twenty-eight men and two women.

Composition
The composition of the 65th government is as follows.

References

Cabinets of Turkey
2016 in Turkish politics
2016 establishments in Turkey
Cabinets established in 2016
Members of the 65th government of Turkey
Cabinets disestablished in 2018